Up Close and Personal is the debut studio album by American rapper Angie Martinez. It was released by Elektra Records on April 17, 2001 in the United States. The album includes the singles "Dem Thangz" and "Coast 2 Coast (Suavemente)".

Critical reception

AllMusic editor Kerry L. Smith found that "Martinez stands her ground when rapping alongside mega-rap stars like these on her debut album, Up Close and Personal [...] Martinez shines on tracks like "Gutter to tha Fancy Ish," on which she flaunts her quick-tongued rap technique and a tough-girl attitude while alternating verses with none other than Busta Rhymes [...] On her first time around, Martinez has delivered a well-rounded album that features solid raps, Latin grooves, and a few lighter, melodic tunes."

Track listing 

Notes
 denotes additional producer
 denotes remix producer
"Coast 2 Coast (Suavemente Remix)" contains the untitled hidden track "No Playaz (Remix)" featuring Lil' Mo & Tony Sunshine.

Sample credits
"Heart & Soul (Interlude)" samples "Native New Yorker" by Odyssey.
"New York, New York" samples "Cathedral" by Galt McDermot.
"Every Little Girl" samples "Fragile" by Sting.
"Coast 2 Coast (Suavemente)" & "Coast 2 Coast (Suavemente - Remix)" samples "Suavemente" by Elvis Crespo.
"Ladies & Gents" samples "Nipple To The Bottle" by Grace Jones.
"Gutter 2 The Fancy Shit" samples "Can't Find The Judge" by Gary Wright.
"Live At Jimmy's" samples "Jimmy" by Boogie Down Productions "Kokomo (song)" by The Beach Boys.
"Breathe" samples "Disco Circus" by Martin Circus & "Walking Into Sunshine" by Central Line (band).
"Live From The Streets" samples Laying The Trap" by Charles Bernstein & "Spanish Town" by Garland Jeffreys.
"Thug Love" samples "One Love" by Whodini.

Charts

References

Angie Martinez albums
2001 albums
Elektra Records albums
Albums produced by the Neptunes
Albums produced by Rockwilder
Albums produced by Salaam Remi
Albums produced by Domingo (producer)